There are at least 14 named lakes and reservoirs in Fergus County, Montana.

Lakes
 Crystal Lake, el.

Reservoirs
 Bear Creek Reservoir, el. 
 Carters Pond, el. 
 Flat Top Reservoir, el. 
 Harri Reservoir, el. 
 Jakes Reservoir, el. 
 Jordan Reservoir, el. 
 Kachia Reservoir, el. 
 Kosier Reservoir, el. 
 Lincoln Reservoir, el. 
 Rindal Reservoir, el. 
 Sloan Reservoir, el. 
 Stafford Reservoir, el. 
 Upper Carters Pond, el.

See also
 List of lakes in Montana

Notes

Bodies of water of Fergus County, Montana
Fergus